Sierra SunTower was a 5 MW commercial concentrating solar power (CSP) plant built and operated by eSolar. The plant is located in Lancaster, California. As of mid-September, 2022, the two towers that were the center of the facility are no longer standing.  However the rest of the plant is still present.

Project overview 
The Sierra SunTower facility was based on power tower CSP technology. The plant featured an array of heliostats which reflected solar radiation to a tower-mounted thermal receiver. The concentrated solar energy boiled water in the receiver to produce steam. The steam was piped to a turbine generator which converted the energy to electricity. The steam coming out of the turbine was condensed and pressurized back into the receiver.

In the summer of 2009, eSolar unveiled the 5 MW Sierra SunTower plant, a commercial facility in Lancaster, California, to demonstrate the efficacy of this CSP technology. Sierra SunTower was connected to the Southern California Edison (SCE) grid and, in spring 2010, it was the only commercial CSP tower facility in North America.

 
Sierra SunTower included two modules. 24,000 heliostats, divided between four sub-fields, tracked the sun and focused its energy onto two tower-mounted receivers. The focused heat converted feedwater piped to the receivers into superheated steam that drove a reconditioned 1947 GE turbine generator to produce electricity. The steam passed through a steam condenser, reverted to water through cooling, and the process repeated.

During the 12 months of construction, Sierra SunTower created over 300 temporary jobs. During operation, the site employed 21 permanent employees.

At the plant's official unveiling, California Governor Arnold Schwarzenegger praised the eSolar solution, “...proving that California’s energy and environmental leadership are advancing carbon-free, cost-effective energy that can be used around the world.”

Sierra SunTower was certified by the California Energy Commission as a renewable energy facility. Power from the facility was sold under a Power Purchase Agreement (PPA) with SCE, with a projected maximum output sufficient to power approximately 4,000 homes.

The 5 MW output from Sierra SunTower displaced  emissions by 7,000 tons per year, an amount equivalent to planting  of trees, removing 1,368 automobiles from the road, or saving 650,000 gallons of gasoline.

Sierra SunTower was designed to validate eSolar's technology at full scale, effectively eliminating scaleup risks, and to serve as a model from which future plants of this type would be built. However, in 2015, the Sierra SunTower was shut down for commercial operation, as it was deemed to be too costly to operate except on the sunniest of days. Thus, it served to show the real-world problems, and unpredictable nature, of concentrated solar power.

Awards 
In December 2009, editors of Power Engineering magazine selected Sierra SunTower as the winner of the “Best Renewable Project”. Each year, Power Engineering magazine recognizes the world's best energy projects. The award distinguished Sierra as an exceptional power generation project toward meeting growing global demand.

In February 2010, Sierra SunTower won Renewable Energy World's “Renewable Project of the Year” award. The award recognized eSolar's achievements in the clean energy industry by naming Sierra SunTower an exceptional breakthrough in the commercialization of solar thermal technology.

Performance data from US Treasury Dept.
According to US Treasury Department - Performance Report and Certification Form, the eSolar Sierra SunTower generated 539 MWh (MegaWatt-hour) of electricity from August 1, 2010, to July 31, 2011.
A total of 539 MWh of gross electrical energy was generated at Sierra during the period Aug 1, 2010 and July 31, 2011.  This was approximately 12.6% of the expected power generation of the initial estimate of 4270 MWh.

Production

See also

List of concentrating solar thermal power companies
List of photovoltaic power stations
List of solar thermal power stations
Renewable energy in the United States
Renewable portfolio standard
Solar power in the United States
Solar power plants in the Mojave Desert

References

External links
official eSolar website — Sierra SunTower.
guntherportfolio.com — Sierra SunTower - Performance

Solar power in the Mojave Desert
Solar power stations in California
Antelope Valley
Buildings and structures in Lancaster, California
Energy infrastructure completed in 2009
Renewable resource companies established in 2009
2009 establishments in California
American companies established in 2009